Slađan Nikodijević (born 1 May 1990) is a Serbian footballer who plays as a forward.

He is the younger brother of Saša Nikodijević.

References

External links
 
 Slađan Nikodijević Stats at utakmica.rs
 

1990 births
Living people
Footballers from Paris
Association football forwards
Serbian footballers
FK Borac Čačak players
FK Donji Srem players
FK Metalac Gornji Milanovac players
OFK Bačka players
FK ČSK Čelarevo players
FK Inđija players
FK Radnički Niš players
FK Radnički 1923 players
Serbian First League players
Serbian SuperLiga players
Serbian expatriate footballers
Expatriate footballers in Italy
Carrarese Calcio players
French people of Serbian descent